The Copa Rio Grande do Norte was the association football state cup of Rio Grande do Norte, organized by the Federação Norte-rio-grandense de Futebol (FNF), in order to decide one of the representatives of the state at the Copa do Brasil.

It was abolished after 2007, when the Campeonato Potiguar began to be played in two rounds, being one of these rounds receiving the name of Copa RN (similar to the Taça Rio in the Campeonato Carioca).

Champions

See also

Campeonato Potiguar
Copa Cidade do Natal
Copa RN

References

External links 
 Official Site of the FNF

Football competitions in Rio Grande do Norte
State football cup competitions in Brazil